Bagheri is a surname. Notable people with the surname include:

Ali Bagheri (born 1966), Iranian diplomat
Amir-Bahman Bagheri, Iranian military officer
Amir Bagheri (born 1978), Iranian chess grandmaster
Farshid Bagheri (born 1992), Iranian footballer
Hasan Bagheri (1956–1983), Iranian revolutionary  and journalist
Jalil Bagheri Jeddi, Iranian paralympic athlete
Kamran Bagheri Lankarani (born 1965), Iranian physician, politician and  Minister of Health and Medical Education
Karim Bagheri (born 1974), Iranian football player and coach
Khosrow Bagheri (born 1957), Iranian philosopher, educational theorist and the president of Philosophy of Education Society of Iran (PESI)
Kourosh Bagheri (born 1977), Iranian weightlifter
Meisam Bagheri, Iranian taekwondo athlete
Mehdi Bagheri (born 1980), Iranian kamancheh player and composer
Mohammad Bagheri (Iranian commander)  (born c. 1960/1961), Iranian Islamic Revolutionary Guard Corps military commander
Mohammad Bagheri (politician) (born 1971),  Iranian Shiite cleric and politician
Mohammad Bagheri Motamed (born 1986), Iranian taekwondo practitioner
Rouhollah Bagheri (born 1991), Iranian footballer

See also
Bagheri Expressway, is an expressway in eastern Tehran in Tehranpars neighborhood
Shahid Bagheri Metro Station, is a station in Tehran Metro Line 2 in Iran